John Berhard Stoeber (July 21, 1898 – November 19, 1971) was an American college football player and coach. He served as the head football coach at Thiel College from 1932 to 1954, compiling a record of 75–54–6. The home field at Thiel is named in his honor.

A native of Reading, Pennsylvania, Stoeber starred in athletics at Reading High School and Springfield College in Springfield, Massachusetts.  At Thiel, he also coached baseball, tennis, track, swimming, wrestling, boxing, soccer, and cross country.  He was a professor of German at the school from 1940 to 1945 and the dean of men from 1946 to 1962.  Stoeber died on November 19, 1971, at Allegheny General Hospital in Pittsburgh, Pennsylvania.

Head coaching record

Football

References

External links
 

1898 births
1971 deaths
American soccer coaches
Springfield Pride football players
Thiel Tomcats athletic directors
Thiel Tomcats baseball coaches
Thiel Tomcats football coaches
Thiel Tomcats men's basketball coaches
College boxing coaches in the United States
College cross country coaches in the United States
College men's soccer coaches in the United States
College swimming coaches in the United States
College tennis coaches in the United States
College track and field coaches in the United States
College wrestling coaches in the United States
Thiel College faculty
Sportspeople from Reading, Pennsylvania
Coaches of American football from Pennsylvania
Players of American football from Pennsylvania
Baseball coaches from Pennsylvania
Basketball coaches from Pennsylvania